Hogsetfeltet is a village in Sørum municipality, Norway. Its population is 624.

References

Villages in Akershus